Timmy Hung Tin-ming (born 1 July 1974) is a Hong Kong actor. He is the eldest son of Sammo Hung.

Background
He was born in Hong Kong as the eldest son of martial arts superstar Sammo Hung and Sammo's Korean first wife Jo Eun-ok (曹恩玉). His younger brothers are Jimmy Hung and Sammy Hung. His only sister is Stephanie Hung.

Personal life
He married actress Janet Chow in 2012 after a few years of dating, and their son Hung Dai-yan (洪大仁) was born in 2013. In April 2015, they had a second son, Hung King-xi (洪竟琋).

Filmography

Film

Television series

References

External links
 
  
 Timmy Hung Tin-Ming at the Hong Kong Movie Database
 Hong Kong Cinemagic: Timmy Hung Tin Ming

1974 births
Living people
Hong Kong male film actors
Hong Kong people of Korean descent
Hong Kong male television actors
TVB actors
20th-century Hong Kong male actors
21st-century Hong Kong male actors
Male actors of Korean descent